Oliver Kruuda (born 27 February 1967 in Põlva) is an Estonian entrepreneur and sport figure.

Since 1998 he is the president of Estonian Handball Association.

He has been the major shareholder of the company Kalev.

In 2005, he was awarded with Order of the White Star, IV class.

In 2000–2011, Oliver was a manager of AS Kalev (renamed AS Luterma in 2007). 

In 2010–2016, he was a Member of the board of Tere AS.

He lives in Dublin, Ireland as of October 2020.

References

Living people
1967 births
Estonian businesspeople
Recipients of the Order of the White Star, 4th Class
Estonian University of Life Sciences alumni
People from Põlva